Marlon Williams (born 31 December 1990) is a New Zealand singer-songwriter, guitarist and actor based in Melbourne, Australia. Primarily known as a solo artist, he works and tours with his backing band The Yarra Benders and first came to attention as front-man of The Unfaithful Ways and for his collaborative work with musician Delaney Davidson.

Early life and family
Williams was born in Christchurch to David Williams, a librarian and musician, and Jenny Rendall, a visual artist, and raised in the nearby port town of Lyttelton. He is of Ngāi Tahu and Ngāi Tai descent. Williams had a musical upbringing and was a member of the choir of the Cathedral of the Blessed Sacrament, which toured Europe in 2009–10. He was educated at Christchurch Boys' High School and learned to play guitar during his final year there.

Career

2007–2013: Early career with The Unfaithful Ways and Delaney Davidson 
Williams founded The Unfaithful Ways at 17 with his high school friends Sebastian Warne and Ben Woolley, along with a science teacher at the school, Simon Brouwer. They quickly gained national attention in New Zealand, playing the Big Day Out, and were nominated for a New Zealand Music Award in 2011.

Williams met acclaimed country singer Delaney Davidson in 2011, and the pair began performing as a duo. Over two years they released three volumes of the series, Sad But True: The Secret History of Country Music Songwriting, garnering critical acclaim, including the New Zealand Country Song and Country Album of the year in 2013. Their final album was released in February 2014.

2013–2018: Early solo career and Marlon Williams 
Relocating to Melbourne, Australia, in mid-2013, Williams began performing solo around town, self-releasing the live album Live At La Niche, touring Australia with US acts Robert Ellis, Cory Chisel and playing Mullumbimby Music Festival. During this time, he lived in Melbourne's inner-city suburb of Abbotsford at the Yarra Hotel.

He began recording his debut solo album in Spring 2014. Despite living in Melbourne, the record was recorded over a year at a Lyttelton studio. That year, he put together his supporting band, The Yarra Benders, aptly named after the pub/hotel they worked and lived in.  The Yarra Benders are musicians Gus Agars, Dave Khan and Ben Woolley, and previously guitarist Dan Parsons.

In April 2015, Williams released his debut self-titled solo album to critical acclaim, debuting at number 10 on the New Zealand Albums Chart, and number 31 on the Australian ARIA Albums Chart. The album was called "captivating" by Rolling Stone Australia, a "revelation" by Metro Magazine and "one of the most impressive country records this year" by ToneDeaf. That same years, he did his first national television performance on SBS Australia's music quiz show RocKwiz, and at the Sydney Opera House for TEDxSydney. In September 2015, Williams signed to American independent label Dead Oceans who then released and distributed the album worldwide on 2 February 2016.

Beginning in June 2014, Williams toured nearly non-stop for three-and-a-half years. While working on his record in 2014, Williams embarked on a co-headline tour with Melody Pool, playing 26 shows around Australia and New Zealand, before closing the year with performances at Queenscliff Music Festival, Wave Rock Weekender, Mullumbimby Music Festival, and a full band tour alongside Justin Townes Earle and Lindi Ortega in Australia and New Zealand. He toured Europe for the first time in May 2015, and in Fall 2015 began performing across the United States, the United Kingdom, Continental Europe, and Australia until November 2017, which included stints opening for Paul Kelly, Lucinda Williams, and Kasey Chambers, and Sam Beam and Jesca Hoop. Williams and the Yarra Benders opened two shows in 2017 for Bruce Springsteen and the E Street Band on their Summer '17 tour.

2018–present: Make Way for Love and Live at Auckland Town Hall
On 16 February 2018, Williams released his album Make Way for Love. To support the record, Willams first toured the United States and Europe before playing a series of European and Australian summer music festival dates through November 2018.

Williams released a live album Live at Auckland Town Hall was released a year later on 1 February 2019 as a double album. The album was recorded in May 2018 at the historic Auckland Town Hall. Williams and the Yarra Benders continued to tour extensively through the end of 2019. In May 2020, Williams premiered a full live concert film of the "Live at Auckland Town Hall" album. The film ran 109 minutes for free through YouTube and Facebook followed by a live Q&A with fans.

Film and television appearances
In 2015, Williams had a supporting role in the ABC Television miniseries The Beautiful Lie; he appeared in all six of the show's episodes. The following year, he had a small role in the 2016 New Zealand independent film The Rehearsal.

Williams appeared in the 2018 Bradley Cooper-directed film A Star is Born, after Cooper saw Williams perform at The Troubadour in Los Angeles and asked him personally to appear in the film. Williams appears as a fictionalized version of himself during a Roy Orbison tribute performance, opposite musician Brandi Carlile and Cooper's character.

The Justin Kurzel-directed film True History of the Kelly Gang, in which Williams plays George King, had its world premiere at the 2019 Toronto International Film Festival. The film also stars Russell Crowe, Nicholas Hoult, Charlie Hunnam and Essie Davis. Williams also has a supporting role in the Australian film Lone Wolf, which was filmed during Summer 2019 and is expected to be released in 2020. In 2021, Williams played Johnny Abbot in Netflix series Sweet Tooth.

As himself 
On 14 June 2016, Marlon Williams and the Yarra Benders made their US television debut as the musical guests on the American late-night talk show Conan. Williams appeared as a subject of the 2018 documentary The New Sound of Country on Prime Rocks in New Zealand, alongside Tami Neilson, Delaney Davidson and Barry Saunders.

Discography

Studio albums

Collaborative albums

Live albums

Other charted songs

Awards and nominations
For his music, Williams has won multiple New Zealand Music Awards, New Zealand's most prominent music award, as well as the country's most significant songwriting honor, APRA's Silver Scroll, among other recognition.

From twelve nominations including three for Album of the Year, Williams has won five New Zealand Music Awards, including Breakthrough Artist of the Year in 2015 and Album of the Year in 2018 for Make Way for Love. Williams was recognized early in his music career when his group The Unfaithful Ways was nominated for the ceremony's Critics' Choice Prize in 2011. He has been a finalist for an APRA Award on four separate years. He won his first APRA Award in 2013 with Delaney Davidson, receiving the honor for Best Country Music Song after being a finalist the previous year in the same category. In 2015, Marlon was shortlisted for the prestigious Silver Scroll songwriting award for "Dark Child." His single "Nobody Gets What They Want Anymore (feat. Aldous Harding)" was awarded the Silver Scroll in 2018. Additionally, he was nominated for a 2015 ARIA Music Award in the category of Best Blues and Roots Album.

In November 2020 he was named one of the best dressed men in show business on David Hartnell MNZM's Best Dressed List.

References

External links
 

1990 births
Living people
New Zealand folk musicians
New Zealand male singer-songwriters
Musicians from Melbourne
Caroline Records artists
People from Christchurch
People educated at Christchurch Boys' High School
Ngāi Tahu people
21st-century New Zealand male singers
Dead Oceans artists
Universal Music Group artists
New Zealand country guitarists
New Zealand alternative country musicians